Chief Thomas Lenana Marealle II OBE (June 15, 1915 – February 14, 2007) was the Paramount Chief (Mangi Mkuu) of the Chagga people of Tanzania and a politician.

After winning a paramount chieftainship election, which he ran against Abdi Shangali of Hai, Jackson Kitali of Moshi, Petro Marealle of Vunjo and John Maruma of Rombo,  Chief Mareale was inaugurated as chief in January 1952. Thomas Marealle ruled alongside Chief Mangi Mwitori. Petro Itosi Marealle consolidated power from the other 3 Chagga chieftains thus making the Chagga more powerful and in control of their affairs during colonial times. The government abolished the system of chieftainships in 1961, although Marealle, anticipating this, had voluntarily left his post the previous year. His tenure as Mangi Mkuu was regarded as a golden age, marked by major improvements in education, health, the cooperative movement, and communications in his area. In particular his court system and his equitable water allocation system are recalled with great nostalgia.

After working for the United Nations in the field of foreign aid for thirteen years, he retired as a diplomat. He died on 14 February 2007 at the age of 92, and buried at his homeplace in Marangu, Moshi.

References

External links

 An interview in Tanzania's Express newspaper

1915 births
2007 deaths
Officers of the Order of the British Empire
Tanzanian diplomats
Tanzanian chiefs